The AREX Class 2000 is an electric multiple unit of the Airport Railroad operated by the Incheon International Airport Railroad on the AREX service. It is used to make the slower local journeys and hence has a more metro like layout with 4 doors per side and longitudinal seating, in contrast to the express layout the 1000s have.

Gallery

References 

Electric multiple units of South Korea
AREX
25 kV AC multiple units
Hyundai Rotem multiple units